The following lists events that happened during 1967 in Luxembourg.

Incumbents

Events
 3 January – The coalition agreement between the CSV and LSAP is renewed and a cabinet reshuffle performed.  Madeleine Frieden-Kinnen becomes the first woman in the cabinet.
 8 April – Representing Luxembourg, Vicky Leandros finishes fourth in the Eurovision Song Contest 1967 with the song L'amour est bleu.
 17 May – Luxembourg adopts the International Labour Organization's regulations on gender equality in wages.
 22 June – A law is passed abolishing compulsory military service.
 16 August – A law is passed mandating the construction of a motorway network in Luxembourg.

Births
 9 June – Michel Majerus, artist

Deaths
 19 August – Hugo Gernsback, inventor
 22 September – Albert Calmes, historian
 9 December – Charles Léon Hammes, jurist
 25 December – René Blum, politician

Footnotes

References
 

 
Luxembourg
Years of the 20th century in Luxembourg
1960s in Luxembourg
Luxembourg